The Ellis Bridge is a century-old bridge in Ahmedabad, Gujarat. It bridges the western and eastern parts of the city across the Sabarmati river. This bowstring arch truss bridge was the first bridge in Ahmedabad, constructed in 1892. Concrete wings were added on either side in 1997 and it was renamed the Swami Vivekananda Bridge.

History

The original wooden bridge was constructed by British engineers in 1870–1871 at a cost of £54,920 (Rs. 5,49,200). Except for two spans on banks, it was destroyed by floods in 1875. A steel bridge was built in 1892 by engineer Himmatlal Dhirajram Bhachech and named after Sir Barrow Helbert Ellis, the commissioner of the North Zone.  The steel was imported from Birmingham. Himmatlal built it at a cost of Rs 407,000 which was lower than the budget of Rs 500,000. The government grew suspicious and thought that low quality materials were used by Himmatlal. An inquiry committee was set up and found that the construction was of superior quality. For saving government money, Himmatlal was subsequently honoured with the title of Rao Sahib.
The foundation block of the Ellis bridge was later moved to the Sanskar Kendra. It reads, 

Thousands heard Mahatma Gandhi declaring his Dandi march on 8 March 1930 from the Ellis bridge.

Proposals to pull down the bridge were made in 1973, 1983 and 1986 but were rejected. The Ahmedabad Municipal Corporation declared the Ellis bridge and its boundary, Manek Burj and the natural water drain near one of the banks of Sabarmati river protected sites in May 1989.

The original steel bridge was narrow and not suited for heavy motorized traffic and so it was closed in 1997. After the documentation, the Manek Burj was partially removed and Ganesh Bari, the Maratha constructed gate, was reconstructed to make space for the bridge. The bridge has been renamed Swami Vivekananda bridge after Swami Vivekanand.

Reconstruction proposal

It was found that steel piers of the bridge became  corroded due to pollution in the Sabarmati river. Consultants appointed for strengthening the bridge, proposed its demolition in 2012 since building a new bridge would be cheaper than strengthening the existing one. It was also planned to run the Ahmedabad Bus Rapid Transit System buses on the new bridge. It is proposed that the steel arches of the old steel bridge should be preserved and placed back on the new bridge. Later the Ahmedabad Municipal Corporation shelved the proposal of the new bridge for the bus system.

Cultural significance
This 120-year-old bridge has become an landmark and a symbol of Ahmedabad. It was featured in several films, such as Kai Po Che! (2013) and Kevi Rite Jaish (2012). The Karnavati Art Gallery is at the western end of the bridge.

References

Bridges completed in 1892
Truss bridges
Bridges in Ahmedabad
1892 establishments in India